Claudio Rinaldi (Urbania, 1852 - after 1909) was an Italian painter, mainly of genre subjects.

Biography
He was a resident of Florence.  During 1874–1875, he was awarded a scholarship by the Institute of Fine Arts of Urbino to study at the Academy of Fine Arts of Florence. In 1884 at Turin, he exhibited La pappa of the nonna and  La stanchezza. The same year at the Promotrice of Florence, All' ombra; Carola reggimi e Una vecchia che si scalda. Other of Rinaldi's works are: a vecchia usuraia; L'amico dei gatti; La stanchezza vìnce la fame; La zittelìona; Il regalo del nonno; L'innocenza; and La mammo laboriosa. One of the painters he mentored was Filippo Marfori Savini.

References

1852 births
Italian genre painters
19th-century Italian painters
Italian male painters
Umbrian painters
Painters from Florence
Year of death uncertain
Accademia di Belle Arti di Firenze alumni
19th-century Italian male artists